Numero may refer to:

Number
Numero sign (№)
Numéro, a French fashion magazine
Numéro#, an electro-pop duo from Montréal
The Numero Group, an American reissue record label
Numero 28, an Italian restaurant in New York City